The Istiglal IST-14.5 anti-materiel rifle (also known as the Istiglal) is a recoil-operated, semi-automatic anti-materiel sniper rifle produced by Telemexanika zavodu, subsidiary of the Ministry of Defence Industry of Azerbaijan.

History
Although developed in 2008, it was only revealed in 2009 during the International Defense Exhibition Fair. Its appearance has attracted a huge number of visitors.

The Istiglal anti-materiel rifle uses the powerful 14.5×114mm round.

It has been exported to the Turkish Armed Forces and the Pakistan Armed Forces.

Technical description
The Istiglal can be taken down into 2 separate components for easy transportation. The rifle is said to be operable in adverse weather such as rain and dirt with temperature ranges from 50 to -50 degrees Celsius.

Variants

Mubariz
A 12.7×108mm version of the Istiglal 14.5mm anti-materiel sniper rifle introduced by the Ministry of Defense Industry of Azerbaijan. The 12.7mm Mubariz sniper rifle is much lighter in comparison to the Istiglal at 15 kg (33 pounds) with a five-round magazine.

Users

 : In use by the Azerbaijani Armed Forces.
 : Used by the Pakistan Army; more planned to be procured.
 : The Turkish Armed Forces is interested in importing the rifle and is having talks with the Azerbaijani Armed Forces. An unknown number of Istiglals were purchased. In April 2011, Mechanical and Chemical Industry Corporation announced that sniper rifle, which will be produced jointly, will differ much from the model that is being tested in Azerbaijan.  Changes will be made in the design, weight and some systems of the weapon. The production of IST-12.7 sniper rifle in Turkey is the first military production transfer of Azerbaijan.

See also
 Yalguzag sniper rifle
 Snipex T-Rex
 Snipex Alligator

References

12.7×108 mm sniper rifles
12.7×108 mm anti-materiel rifles
14.5×114mm sniper rifles
14.5×114mm anti-materiel rifles
Rifles of Azerbaijan
Short recoil firearms
Azerbaijani inventions
Military of Azerbaijan
Semi-automatic rifles
Weapons and ammunition introduced in 2008
Anti-materiel rifles